Etrek Etraby is a district (estrap) in Balkan Province, Turkmenistan. It has an area of 13,850 km2 and an estimated population of 54,000 (2000).  Its capital is Gyzyletrek. The former name of the district was Gyzyletrek District.

Balkan Region
Districts of Turkmenistan